Luftwaffe Commander is a Microsoft Windows-based  World War 2 theme combat flight simulation created by Strategic Simulations, Inc. (SSI) and released in 1999 but copyrighted in 1998.

Gameplay
The player enters a career as a Luftwaffe pilot on five fronts when playing in campaign mode, but first has to successfully train on a Heinkel biplane. The fronts featured in campaign mode are Spain, France, Britain, Russian Front and the Western Front. In single-player mode each campaign mission may be flown individually and each of the five fronts has ten missions. In the Air Combat mode or menu the player can choose to have a skirmish with himself, an A.I. wingman and other A.I. opponents of several dozen chosen enemy aircraft.

Reviews
Computer Gaming World (Apr, 1999)

References 

1999 video games
Computer wargames
Strategic Simulations games
Video games developed in the United States
Windows games
Windows-only games
World War II flight simulation video games